Chaulagain is a surname in Nepal. The people of this surname belongs to Bahun (Hill Brahmin) and Chhetri caste. Chaulagain belongs to Bharadvaja gotra. Alternative spellings include Chamlagain, Chaulagai and Chamrel (commonly used by Chaulagains from southern Lalitpur area).

Origin 
The surname is considered to be originated in Sinja valley of Jumla region. The people living in Chaundila Gau (Chaundila village) are said to be later called as Chaulagain. In fourteenth century, during the Khas Empire and then in the Jumla kingdom, it was customary to provide wages to royal priests, astrologers, Pandits, army, officers, allies etc by the kings. There are records of people with Chaulagain surname receiving the wages from the first king of Kalyal dynasty of Jumal kingdom, Baliraja. The surname is then said to spread all around Nepal from Jumla region.

Notable people 
Notable people with the name include:

 Sajja Chaulagain, Nepalese singer, winner of the 2020 Nepal Idol.
 Kamal Prasad Chaulagain,  Nepalese politician.

See also 

 Chapagain
 Siwakoti
 Karki (surname)

References 

Surnames of Nepalese origin
Nepali-language surnames
Lists of people by surname
Khas surnames